Daybrook is an unincorporated community in Monongalia County, West Virginia, United States.

Unincorporated communities in Monongalia County, West Virginia
Unincorporated communities in West Virginia